Ryan Wilson may refer to:

Sportspeople
Ryan Wilson (wrestler), American wrestler
Ryan Wilson (ice hockey) (born 1987), Canadian ice hockey player
Ryan Wilson (hurdler) (born 1980), American hurdler
Ryan Wilson (rugby union) (born 1989), Scottish rugby union player
Ryan Wilson (rugby league) (born 1993), English rugby league footballer who has played in the 2010s for Doncaster, and West Hull A.R.L.F.C.
Ryan Giggs (Ryan Joseph Wilson, born 1973), Welsh footballer
Ryan Wilson (bowler) on List of world bowling champions

Others
Ryan Wilson (poet) (born 1982), American poet
Ryan Wilson, American guitarist in The Love Willows
Ryan Wilson, guitarist for The Pigeon Detectives
Ryan Wilson, guitarist for The Holy Fire